His Majesty's Hired armed cutter Sandwich served the Royal Navy from 23 May 1798 until the  captured her on 14 June 1799. She then served in the French Navy until the Royal Navy recaptured her on 15 October 1803. The Navy purchased her in 1804 and she served for some months in 1805 as HMS Sandwich before she was sold in Jamaica. During this period she captured three small French privateers in two days.

British service
On 14 October 1798 Sandwich captured the Dutch hoy Hoop and her cargo.  was in sight.

Capture
Sandwich was under the command of Lieutenant George Lempriere and cruising off the coast of Barcelona on 14 June 1799 when she sighted a large fleet. Lempriere believed the vessels to be a British fleet and sailed towards them. When the strange vessels did not reply to the recognition signals, Lempriere realized that they were enemy vessels and attempted to sail away. The French fleet detached a lugger, possibly , to pursue Sandwich. A frigate joined the lugger in pursuit and towards evening the lugger opened fire with her bow chasers. The frigate then too opened fire, with Sandwich returning fire as best she could. By 1a.m. the frigate was within musket shot of Sandwich and any further resistance would have been futile. Lempriere then struck to Créole.

French service
The French Navy took Sandwich into service, retaining her existing name. She was stationed at Lorient in August 1799. She then served in the French Navy until 1803.

Recapture and Royal Navy service
Among the French vessels were the French 16-gun brig-sloop Goéland, and Sandwich.

In 1804 the Royal Navy purchased the cutter Sandwich at Jamaica. It commissioned her under Lieutenant G. Bernarding in 1805.

On 21 April 1805, Captain Charles Dashwood of HMS Bacchante instructed Bernarding to take Sandwich out on a cruise. On 6 May Sandwich was on the Bahama Banks, about eight leagues from West Caicos. She was in company with the schooner Nassau when together they encountered the French privateer schooner Renomée. Renomée was armed with one long 9-pounder gun and two 4-pounders, and had a crew of 56 men.

The next day Sandwich and Nassau captured the privateer Rencontre. Rencontre was armed with two 4-pounder guns and had a crew of 42 men. That same day the British vessels captured Vénus, which was armed with one gun and had a crew of 35 men. Bernarding would have liked to continue to cruise but felt obliged to cut his cruise short because of the number of prisoners he had taken.

Fate
The Navy sold Sandwich in Jamaica in 1805.

Notes

Citations

References

 

  
 

1790s ships
Hired armed vessels of the Royal Navy
Captured ships
Cutters of the French Navy
Cutters of the Royal Navy